The Croatia women's national sevens team represents Croatia in Rugby sevens. They compete regularly in Rugby Europe Women's Sevens Conference division. They competed at the 2021 Rugby Europe Women's Sevens Conference and won bronze.

Players

Previous Squads 

Petra Drušković 
Maja Gajica 
Ada Tanasković 
Nikolina Pivčević 
Antea Dedić 
Lucrezia Meštrov 
Vedrana Alajbeg 
Franćeska Pleština 
Tihana Žaja 
Ana-marija Cikojević
Željka Butković 
Mateja Spajic
Eleonora Ozeke 
Gloria Molak 
Ornela Bešker Amulić

Tournament History

Rugby Europe Women's Sevens

References

Rugby union in Croatia
Women's national rugby sevens teams